Ole L. Aarsvolds (born November 6, 1940), is an American politician who was a member of the North Dakota House of Representatives. He served from 1989–2008. He is an alumnus of Mayville State University and the University of North Dakota. He was a farmer and former director of the Traill County Farmers Union.

References

1940 births
Living people
Mayville State University alumni
University of North Dakota alumni
People from Traill County, North Dakota
Farmers from North Dakota
Democratic Party members of the North Dakota House of Representatives